Land of Broken Hearts is the debut studio album released by the Danish progressive metal band Royal Hunt. The album was remastered and re-released in October of 2021, with the inclusion of five bonus tracks.

Track listing
All songs written by André Andersen.
 "Running Wild" – 5:08
 "Easy Rider" – 4:59
 "Flight" – 4:00
 "Age Gone Wild" – 4:32
 "Martial Arts" (Instrumental) – 1:52
 "One by One" – 4:34
 "Heart of the City" – 3:43
 "Land of Broken Hearts" – 4:41
 "Freeway Jam" (Instrumental) – 1:32
 "Kingdom Dark" – 4:28
 "Stranded" – 4:41  (Bonus Track for Japan) 
 "Day In Day Out" – 3:22  (Bonus Track for Japan)

Personnel
André Andersen – keyboards and guitars
Henrik Brockmann – lead and backing vocals
Steen Mogensen – bass guitar
Kenneth Olsen – drums
Henrik Johannessen – all guitars on "Day In Day Out"
Jacob Kjaer – guitars on "Freeway Jam", "Day In Day Out(Video)", "Stranded", "Age Gone Wild"
Mac Guanaa – guitar solos
Maria McTurk – backing vocals
Maria Nørfelt – backing vocals
Carsten Olsen – backing vocals

Production
Mixing – Peter Brander and Royal Hunt at Media Sound Productions
Recorded at Mirand Studio, Copenhagen. "Stranded" and "Day In And Day Out" recorded at Sterling Sound, New York.
Mastered at Sweet Silence Studios
Logo and direction by Peter Brander

References

External links
Heavy Harmonies page

Royal Hunt albums
1992 debut albums